The Yale Bulldogs women's hockey team will represent Yale University in the 2009–10 NCAA Division I women's ice hockey season. The Bulldogs are coached by Hilary Witt. Witt is assisted by Kim Mathias and Paul Nemetz-Carlson. The strength and conditioning coach is Joe Maher.

Offseason
June 14: With eight players having graduated in 2009, the Yale women's ice hockey team began to recruit for the Class of 2013. Eight incoming freshmen will join the roster for 2009–10. The eight are Erin Callahan, Emily DesMeules, Jamie Gray, Jen Matichuk, Danielle Moncion, Tara Tomimoto, Natalie Wedell, and Alyssa Zupon.
July 9: Two former Yale Bulldogs were invited to USA Hockey's National Festival. Forward Crysti Howser and defenseman Helen Resor are among the group of 41 elite players who will head to Blaine, Minn., Aug. 18-24 for a series of practices and games. After the National Festival 23 of those players will be chosen to go on the Qwest Tour as the U.S. Women's National Team, and 21 of those players then will be selected to play for Team USA in the 2010 Olympics. Resor is one of nine players on the National Festival roster who have played in the Olympics before.

Exhibition

Regular season
January 8: Mandi Schwartz returned to Yale on Jan. 8 after a year away from school battling leukemia.
February 10, 2010: Yale women's hockey head coach Hilary Witt was inducted into the Women's Beanpot Hall of Fame. The induction honors her performance as a player for Northeastern in the annual tournament featuring the four Boston-area women's hockey teams. The ceremony was held prior to the Beanpot Championship game at Harvard's Bright Center.
February 17: Bray Ketchum and Jaclyn Snikeris of Yale are among 45 nominees for the Patty Kazmaier Memorial Award.

Standings

Roster

Schedule
The Nutmeg Classic will held on November 27 and 28.

Player stats

Skaters

Goaltenders

Postseason

NCAA hockey tournament

Awards and honors
Alyssa Clarke, Defense, Senior, 2010 Honorable Mention
Aleca Hughes, ECAC All-Academic
Bray Ketchum, Forward, Junior, 2010 Second Team All-Ivy
Jacklyn Snikeris, Goaltender, Junior, 2010 First Team All-Ivy
Jacklyn Snikeris, ECAC All-Academic

References

External links
Official site

Yale
Yale Bulldogs women's ice hockey seasons
Yale Bulldogs
Yale Bulldogs